A Mummery tent is a small, lightweight tent designed and used by Albert Frederick Mummery in the 1880s and named after him. Fred Mummery (1855–1895) was an English pioneer in alpine climbing, making many first ascents, and he developed this type of tent for his lightweight expeditions.

Background
The first tent designed specifically for mountaineering was the Whymper tent of the 1860s. Mummery favoured small expeditions without professional guides or porters so he required a much smaller and lighter tent, which he developed between 1888 and 1892.

Design

In his 1892 book Mountaineering, Mummery's contemporary Clinton Dent gave a detailed description of the design. It was a ridge tent with low side walls, very similar to a current-day "pup tent". The roof and wall material that he used was oiled silk. Tents were made in various sizes but  was typical, which could accommodate two people.
Mummery's revolutionary idea was to put them to additional use as tent poles – one at each end of the ridge and supported by guy ropes. The weight (excluding ice axes which were carried anyway) could be less than 2 pounds (1 kg) ( with groundsheet and tent pegs). Unlike Whymper's tent, which usually had attached flooring, Mummery used a separate groundsheet, if he used one at all.

Production
Mummery did not attempt to exploit his design commercially but in 1892 the British firm Benjamin Edgington put the tent into production. Parsons, former CEO of Karrimor, has commented "... as a general design it was ideal and the tent, whether in canvas or silk, virtually became an emblem of high-altitude camps until the 1950s". It remained in production until 1968.

Subsequent use and developments

Mummery tents were first used in Himalaya when Martin Conway took them on his Karakoram expedition of 1892.
Mummery, Norman Collie and Geoffrey Hastings went on the 1895 Nanga Parbat expedition, the first to attempt an 8000-metre summit and which led to Mummery's death. Collie later described the small, silk tents they used and later wrote nostalgically of expeditions.

William and Fanny Bullock Workman explored Karakoram glaciers in 1908 and Fanny was photographed beside her modified version of the Mummery tent. In 1920 Harold Raeburn discussed an improved design with a groundsheet attached and commented that ice axes were too short to be tent poles. These tents were among those used on the 1921 British Mount Everest reconnaissance expedition and two Mummeries were used at the East Rongbuk Glacier camp before and after the culminating ascent to the North Col.

Notes

References

Tents